Greensboro North Airport  is a private airport located 10 miles north of Greensboro, North Carolina.

Permission is required prior to landing.

References

Airports in North Carolina
Transportation in Greensboro, North Carolina